Twisted Records is an American record label founded by Rob Di Stefano and Mark Davenport in 1996. Born from the shuttered TRIBAL America label (and its Tribal UK subsidiary), Twisted pioneered the hard house and progressive club styles that rose to international success in the early 2000s.

It released hits such as "Fired Up", by Funky Green Dogs, "Elements" & "Music is The Answer" by Danny Tenaglia, "Be Yourself" by Celeda, "Revolution" by Superchumbo, "Muscles" by Club 69, "So Get Up" by USL, "Walking On Thin Ice" by Yoko Ono, "Free Your Mind" by Sapphirecut and "Dark Beat" by Oscar G and Ralph Falcon.

The label released classic albums such as Danny Tenaglia's Tourism, Funky Green Dogs' Get Fired Up, Celeda's This Is It, Club 69's Style, and Superchumbo's Wowie Zowie.

Roster 

American record labels
Record labels established in 1996
House music record labels
MCA Records